is a concert hall complex consisting of the main "Ark Hall", with a pipe organ, and other facilities, located in Tokorozawa, Saitama, west of Tokyo, Japan. It opened in 1993, and is operated by the Tokorozawa Cultural Foundation. It is also called "Tokorozawa Muse", or sometimes just "Muse" for short.

Facilities
Ark Hall (large-sized main hall), Marquee Hall (medium-sized hall), Cube Hall (small-sized hall), and The Square (exhibition gallery space), and some other facilities

The Bavarian Radio Symphony Orchestra and Montreal Symphony Orchestra have performed here.

Ark Hall 
2,002-seat symphony hall with a pipe organ, for classical music

Pipe organ
5,563 pipes / 75 stops, manufactured by Rieger Orgelbau of Austria

Marquee Hall 
798-seat horseshoe-shaped theatre

Cube Hall
318-seat hall designed for chamber music performances

The Square 
Exhibition gallery space

History

Access

 8 minutes' walk, or one stop one coin(100yen) ride by bus, from East exit of Kōkū-kōen Station on the Seibu Shinjuku Line, approximately 30 to 45 minutes from central Tokyo.

Surrounding area
"Muse" is located next to Kōkū-kōen Park, and Tokorozawa Aviation Museum
 Tokorozawa City Library
 Tokorozawa City Office
 Tokorozawa Central Post office
 Tokorozawa Police Station
 Tokorozawa Transmitter Site

Other uses
Concert halls, or sometimes the route to Kōkū-kōen Station, can be seen in some Japanese TV dramas and movies, as they are often used as filming locations.

See also
List of concert halls

External links 

 Official website 

Buildings and structures in Tokorozawa, Saitama
Concert halls in Japan
Theatres in Japan
Arts centres in Japan
Tourist attractions in Saitama Prefecture
Music venues completed in 1993
1993 establishments in Japan